Shania Caroline Robba (born 19 December 2001) is a Gibraltarian footballer who plays for Lions Gibraltar the Gibraltar women's national team as a striker.

Club career 
Robba began her career at the women's team of Lincoln Red Imps, playing with the boys' team at first until she stepped up to senior football at the age of 14. In 2018 and 2019, she attended trials at Everton, FC Twente and Liverpool alongside Red Imps teammate Tiffany Viagas. When Lincoln folded their women's team in 2020, Robba signed for Lions Gibraltar for the 2020–21 season, before heading off to Loughborough University that summer. In 2021 she appeared in the second season of the BT Sport series Ultimate Goal. She remains registered with Lions, making her first appearance of the 2021–22 season on 15 December 2021.

International career 
Having represented the Gibraltar U16s in two development tournaments in Malta in 2018 and 2019, Robba made her senior debut for Gibraltar on 24 June 2021 in a 1–4 friendly away loss to Liechtenstein, scoring Gibraltar's first ever goal in a FIFA-sanctioned match in the process.

Personal life 
Shania Robba is the twin sister of Gibraltar netball and futsal international Caitlin Robba, who has also played as a goalkeeper in association football and studies with her at Loughborough University. She is also a futsal player, representing Loughborough's women's team with her sister while also earning caps for Gibraltar's national futsal team, scoring twice on her debut against Belgium in a UEFA Women's Futsal Euro 2022 qualifier which ended 3-3.

Career statistics

International

International goals
''Gibraltar score listed first, score column indicates score after each Robba goal.

References 

Living people
2001 births
Gibraltarian women's footballers
Women's association football forwards
Lincoln Red Imps F.C. players
Lions Gibraltar F.C. Women players
Gibraltar women's international footballers
Gibraltarian expatriate footballers
Twin sportspeople
Gibraltarian twins
Expatriate women's footballers in England
Women's futsal players
Gibraltarian expatriate sportspeople in England